Abbas ibn Asadullah bin Ali al-Khalili al-Najafi, also known as Abbas al-Khalili, and Abbas Khalili (1895 or 1896 – 10 February 1972) was an Iraqi-born Iranian diplomat, newspaper publisher, poet and novelist. He was a pillar of the Najaf revolt over the British Mandate in 1918, and was sentenced to death, eventually fleeing to Iran, where spent the rest of his life. The Iranian government's criticism of his newspaper and writing intensified. By 1949, the Iranian government sent him as the Iranian Emperor's ambassador to the Ethiopian Empire and Yemen.

Early life and family 
Abbas Khalili was born in Najaf, Iraq on either 1895 or 1896. His family was religious and his father was Islamic cleric Sheikh Asad-Allāh. His brother was poet . His uncle was Islamic scholar .

During World War I (in 1918), the British occupied Iraq, which eventually lead to a resistance movement. Khalili was one of the twelve leaders of the Siege of Najaf (1918) in a group called the Society for Islamic Movement (Farsi: Jamʿiyat-e nahżat-e eslāmi; also known as The League of the Islamic Awakening in British publications). After the defeat of this uprising, he was sentenced to death by the British occupying forces, but after an adventurous trip, he managed to escape to Iran. For three years he was living in Rasht, and using the pseudonym Ali Fatiy-al-Eslām. Because of his accent speaking Farsi, he was nicknamed by locals Ḵalili-e Arab (English: Kalili the Arab).

Career

Government work, politics 
From 1922 until 1929, Ḵalili worked as a translator in the Iranian Legal Office of the Ministry of Justice (Edāra-ye ḥoquqi-e Wezārat-e ʿadliya).

Khalili served several government roles and he was appointed in 1949 as the Iranian Embassy in Yemen and Ethiopian Empire. He was active in the formation of the Iranian political party National Front (during the second front) in November 1958.

Newspaper publishing, editing, writing 
The Eqdām newspaper was considered an extremist and critical, which upset some and by 1927 the paper was suspended. He was also involved in working for the Iranian Baladiya newspaper, and Bahār monthly literary journal.

Khalili wrote poetry in both Persian and Arabic and has translated about 1100 verses of Ferdowsi's Shahnameh into Arabic and also published several novels. His novels all featured narration, often with the narrator being a woman telling a sad story.

Personal life 
His second wife was Mahyār Ḵalili. He had four sons and two daughters, including poet Simin Behbahani in 1927.

He died on 25 February 1972 from a stroke in Tehran, Iran.

Bibliography

Short stories, articles

Novels, books

References 

1890s births
1972 deaths
People from Najaf
Ambassadors of Iran
Iranian newspaper publishers (people)
Leaders of the National Front (Iran)
20th-century Iranian people
Iraqi multilingual poets
Iraqi emigrants to Iran